The Carolina Rhinos were one of the original 15 teams to join the inaugural 2000 AF2 season. They were members of the American Conference for their entirety of existence, and the Eastern Division in 2001 and 2002. In their first year, they won 7 of their first 9 games, finished the 2000 season with a 9 wins and 7 losses, en route to the playoffs, before losing to the Augusta Stallions.  In 2001, again, they won 7 of their first 9 games, completing a season record of 12 wins and 4 losses, and for the first time ever, they won a playoff game, beating the Tulsa Talons, before losing to the eventual champion, Quad City Steamwheelers.  In 2002, everyone expected Carolina to not only go to the playoffs, but to do something great.  The Rhinos. didn't do so well on the playing field, going 5-11, and missed the playoffs.  To add insult to injury, the Rhinos folded after their post season-less year, and left Arena Football to the Carolina Cobras, which fittingly, folded 2 years after the Rhinos said good-bye to the BI-LO Center.

Season-by-season

External links
 Carolina Rhinos on ArenaFan.com

Defunct af2 teams
Sports in Greenville, South Carolina
American football teams established in 2000
American football teams disestablished in 2002
American football teams in South Carolina
2000 establishments in South Carolina
2002 disestablishments in South Carolina